The 2019 Players Championship was the 46th Players Championship and was played March 14–17 at TPC Sawgrass in Ponte Vedra Beach, Florida. It was the 38th edition held at the Stadium Course and the first in March in thirteen years. 

On January 28, 2019, it was announced the 2019 Players Championship would have a $12.5 million purse, "the biggest prize professional golf has ever seen for a single tournament." It was a 13 percent increase from the 2018 Championship.

Rory McIlroy shot a two-under 70 in the final round for 272 (−16) to win his first Players, one stroke ahead of runner-up Jim Furyk. Defending champion Webb Simpson finished six strokes back, tied for 16th place.

Venue

Course layout

Field
The field consisted of 144 players meeting the following criteria:

1. Winners of PGA Tour events since last Players
Keegan Bradley (2,9), Cameron Champ, Bryson DeChambeau (2,8,9), Rickie Fowler (2,5,9,13), J. B. Holmes (2,9), Charles Howell III (2,9,13), Dustin Johnson (2,4,7,9,13), Michael Kim (2), Brooks Koepka (2,4,9,13), Matt Kuchar (2,9,13), Marc Leishman (2,8,9,13), Adam Long, Troy Merritt (2), Phil Mickelson (2,7,9,13), Keith Mitchell (2), Francesco Molinari (2,4,8,9), Kevin Na (2), Andrew Putnam (2,9), Justin Rose (2,7,9), Xander Schauffele (2,6,7,9,13), Webb Simpson (2,5,9), Brandt Snedeker (2), Martin Trainer, Justin Thomas (2,4,7,9,13), Kevin Tway (2), Bubba Watson (2,4,7,9), Aaron Wise (2), Tiger Woods (2,6,9)

2. Top 125 from previous season's FedEx Cup points list
An Byeong-hun, Abraham Ancer, Ryan Armour, Daniel Berger, Ryan Blaum, Scott Brown, Bronson Burgoon, Rafa Cabrera-Bello (9), Patrick Cantlay (9), Bud Cauley, Paul Casey (9), Alex Čejka, Stewart Cink, Austin Cook, Joel Dahmen, Jason Day (4,5,7,9), Jason Dufner (8), Tyler Duncan, Harris English, Tony Finau (9), Tommy Fleetwood (9), Brice Garnett, Brian Gay, Branden Grace (9), Emiliano Grillo, Chesson Hadley, Adam Hadwin, Brandon Harkins, Tyrrell Hatton (9), Brian Harman, Russell Henley, Charley Hoffman, Tom Hoge, Billy Horschel (9), Beau Hossler, John Huh, Zach Johnson (4), Kang Sung-hoon, Kim Si-woo (5), Chris Kirk, Kevin Kisner (9), Patton Kizzire, Russell Knox, Satoshi Kodaira, Jason Kokrak, Kelly Kraft, Anirban Lahiri, Martin Laird, Andrew Landry, Danny Lee, Luke List, Hideki Matsuyama (7,9), Rory McIlroy (4,6,8,9), Ryan Moore, Trey Mullinax, Grayson Murray, Alex Norén (9), Louis Oosthuizen (9), Ryan Palmer, Pan Cheng-tsung, Scott Piercy, J. T. Poston, Ted Potter Jr., Ian Poulter (9), Séamus Power, Jon Rahm (9), Chez Reavie, Patrick Reed (4,9), Patrick Rodgers, Sam Ryder, Rory Sabbatini, Sam Saunders, Ollie Schniederjans, Charl Schwartzel, Adam Scott (9), Cameron Smith (9), J. J. Spaun, Jordan Spieth (4,9), Scott Stallings, Kyle Stanley (9), Brendan Steele, Henrik Stenson (4,9), Kevin Streelman, Brian Stuard, Nick Taylor, Vaughn Taylor, Peter Uihlein, Harold Varner III, Jhonattan Vegas, Jimmy Walker (4), Nick Watney, Richy Werenski, Gary Woodland (9,13)

Kevin Chappell, James Hahn, Kim Meen-whee, Jamie Lovemark, William McGirt (8), Sean O'Hair, and Pat Perez did not play 

3. Top 125 (medical)
Lucas Glover

4. Major champions from the past five years
Sergio García (9), Martin Kaymer (5), Danny Willett

5. Players Championship winners from the past five years

6. The Tour Championship winners from the past three years

7. World Golf Championship winners from the past three years

8. Memorial Tournament and Arnold Palmer Invitational winners from the past three years

9. Top 50 from the Official World Golf Ranking
Kiradech Aphibarnrat, Lucas Bjerregaard, Matt Fitzpatrick, Li Haotong, Shane Lowry, Thorbjørn Olesen, Eddie Pepperell, Matt Wallace

10. Senior Players champion from prior year
Vijay Singh

11. Web.com Tour money leader from prior season
Im Sung-jae

12. Money leader during the Web.com Tour Finals
Denny McCarthy

13. Top 10 current year FedEx Cup points leaders

14. Remaining positions and alternates filled through current year FedEx Cup standings
Michael Thompson (41)
Talor Gooch (43)
Corey Conners (50)
Aaron Baddeley (61)
Scott Langley (62)
Jim Furyk (64)
Dominic Bozzelli (65)
Wyndham Clark (72)

Nationalities in the field

Round summaries

First round
Thursday, March 14, 2019

Keegan Bradley and Tommy Fleetwood shot 7-under-par rounds of 65 to share the lead by one stroke over An Byeong-hun and Brian Harman. Harris English scored an albatross on the par-5 11th hole, the third albatross in as many years at TPC Sawgrass.

Second round
Friday, March 15, 2019

Third round
Saturday, March 16, 2019

Final round
Sunday, March 17, 2019

Scorecard
Final round

Cumulative tournament scores, relative to par
{|class="wikitable" span = 50 style="font-size:85%;
|-
|style="background: Red;" width=10|
|Eagle
|style="background: Pink;" width=10|
|Birdie
|style="background: PaleGreen;" width=10|
|Bogey
|style="background: Green;" width=10|
|Double bogey
|}

References

External links

2019
2019 in golf
2019 in American sports
2019 in sports in Florida
March 2019 sports events in the United States